Manju Nadgoda (born 11 July 1976, in Belgaum, Karnataka) is a former One Day International cricketer who represented India. She played one One Day International.

References

Living people
People from Belgaum
1976 births
India women One Day International cricketers
Sportswomen from Karnataka

Indian women cricketers